Sergei Alekseyevich Shuvalov (24 June 1951 – 25 September 2021) was a Russian politician.

Early life and education
Shuvalov was born on 24 June 1951, in Saratov, then part of the Russian Soviet Federative Socialist Republic, in the Soviet Union. He studied at the Saratov Polytechnic Institute, graduating in 1973 and becoming a junior researcher in the institute's electronics department. He eventually attained the degree of Doctor of Economic Sciences, and was a professor.

Soviet politics and business career
Shuvalov began working as an instructor, and then deputy departmental head, of the Komsomol's Saratov regional committee in 1976, and then as an instructor in the organizational department in the party organs of the Communist Party of the Soviet Union's Volga District Committee and then the Saratov City Committee from 1979 until 1988. That year he entered state administrative work, and in 1991 became deputy chairman of the State Property Management Committee of Saratov Oblast. Between 1992 and 1996 he was head of a number of commercial enterprises, from 1992 until 1996 as director of the company Shag-R, and then as director of the Shar-S company in 1997.  He was appointed First Deputy Minister of Economy and Investment Policy of Saratov Oblast in July 1997. In February 1998 Shuvalov became the Oblast's Minister of Economy, Investment Policy and Interregional Relations. This was followed by his appointment in September 1998 as the Oblast's First Deputy Prime Minister, and Minister of Economy, and later its Vice Governor.

Regional and national politics
Shuvalov was elected as a deputy to the Saratov Oblast Duma in September 2002, and was chairman of its third convocation from 16 September 2002 until 12 April 2005. He held this post until 13 May 2010. During his time on the council, he sat on several of its committees. He was a member of its budget committee from May 2005 to February 2008, and its housing policy and housing and communal services committee from July to October 2007, before becoming its deputy chairman. In June 2008 he reverted to being a member. In February 2008 he became deputy chairman of the budget committee. After leaving the Federation Council Shuvalov was acting Deputy Chairman of the Government of Saratov Oblast from 1 June 2010 until 13 July 2011, supervising its e-government project. He served for a time as the president of FC Sokol Saratov.

Awards and death
He had also received an honorary diploma from the Federation Council. His son, Stanislav, graduated from Saratov State Medical University as a cardiologist in 1998, later serving as Saratov Oblast's Deputy Minister of Health.

Shuvalov died from complications of COVID-19 in Saratov on 25 September 2021, during the COVID-19 pandemic in Russia.

References 

1951 births
2021 deaths
Politicians from Saratov
20th-century Russian politicians
21st-century Russian politicians
Recipients of the Medal of the Order "For Merit to the Fatherland" II class
Communist Party of the Soviet Union members
Members of the Federation Council of Russia (after 2000)
Deaths from the COVID-19 pandemic in Russia